The Cahiers antispécistes ("Antispeciesist notebooks"), originally called Cahiers antispécistes lyonnais ("Lyon antispeciesist notebooks"), was a French-language journal published from 1991 to 2019, with the aim of disseminating antispeciesist ideas and stimulating debate on animal ethics, particularly on the distinction between animal liberation and ecology. It was published quarterly during its first years of existence, then annually. Issue 43, the last issue, was published in August 2019.

History 
David Olivier, Yves Bonnardel and three other French activists in May 1989 published a pamphlet Nous ne mangeons pas de viande pour ne pas tuer d'animaux ("We don't eat meat so we don't kill animals"), in response to debate around vegetarianism in the animal protection movement in France. Soon afterwards, they contacted Paola Cavalieri, an Italian activist and philosopher, about the possibility of creating a journal.

The journal was founded in 1991 as Cahiers antispécistes lyonnais, by Olivier, Bonnardel and Françoise Blanchon; they were the first people in France to use the term antispeciesism and speak out against it. The journal's name came from what its first three editors defined as its focus: "to question speciesism and to explore the scientific, cultural and political implications of such a project". The original intention was to have similar journals published in many different cities throughout France; by September 1994, these failed to materialise, so "lyonnais" was dropped from the name. The journal used the subtitle "revue de lutte pour la libération animale" ("journal of the fight for animal liberation") from its original publication to 1996, before changing it to "réflexion et action pour l'égalité animale" ("reflection and action for animal equality") in 1998.

As well as articles on moral philosophy, Cahiers antispécistes contained translated versions and commentaries of texts written by English-speaking animal rights authors, including Tom Regan and Peter Singer. It also included interviews with leaders within the radical animal rights movement. The journal's publication and analysis of antispeciesist texts was considered to be "a militant project in itself". It also criticised the concept of a species, as "taxonomic constructions essentially meant to categorise and justify human superiority".

Olivier was editor from 1991 to 2004, Blanchon from 1991 to 1996, the date that Bonnardel ceased being an editor is uncertain, but it was during the 1990s. Brigitte Gothière and Estiva Reus were editors from 1998 to 2019.

La révolution antispéciste ("The antispeciesist revolution"), a selection of twelve texts from Cahiers antispécistes, published by the Presses Universitaires de France in 2018, constitutes according to, the author of the preface, Renan Larue, "a way of doing justice" to the writers and editors of Cahiers Antispécistes, whose work has for 30 years been "thought on the margins of academia" and have "often encountered complete indifference".

References

External links 
 
 Articles published in English

1991 establishments in France
2019 disestablishments in France
Animal ethics journals
Annual journals
Defunct journals
French-language journals
Publications disestablished in 2019
Publications established in 1991
Quarterly journals
Vegetarian-related mass media